"Time" is the second single from Love Moves, the 1990 album by Kim Wilde. 

The song was slightly remixed from the version on the album for its release as a single and was extended for the 12" and CD-single formats. It was released exclusively in the United Kingdom where it stalled at the bottom end of the chart, but managed to remain there for three weeks.

Chart performance

References

Kim Wilde songs
1990 songs
Songs written by Ricky Wilde
Songs written by Kim Wilde